The Canton of Bruyères is a largely rural French administrative and electoral grouping of communes in the Vosges département of eastern France and in the region of Grand Est. The canton has its administrative centre at Bruyères.

Composition
At the French canton reorganisation which came into effect in March 2015, the canton was expanded from 30 to 51 communes:

Aydoilles
Badménil-aux-Bois
Bayecourt
Beauménil
Belmont-sur-Buttant
Biffontaine
Bois-de-Champ
Brouvelieures
Bruyères
Champdray
Champ-le-Duc
Charmois-devant-Bruyères
Cheniménil
Destord
Deycimont
Docelles
Domèvre-sur-Durbion
Domfaing
Dompierre
Fays
Fiménil
Fontenay
Fremifontaine
Girecourt-sur-Durbion
Grandvillers
Gugnécourt
Herpelmont
Jussarupt
Laval-sur-Vologne
Laveline-devant-Bruyères
Laveline-du-Houx
Lépanges-sur-Vologne
Méménil
Mortagne
La Neuveville-devant-Lépanges
Nonzeville
Padoux
Pallegney
Pierrepont-sur-l'Arentèle
Les Poulières
Prey
Rehaupal
Les Rouges-Eaux
Le Roulier
Sainte-Hélène
Sercœur
Vervezelle
Villoncourt
Viménil
Xamontarupt 
Zincourt

References

Bruyeres